Jurek is a Polish masculine given name, the most common diminutive form (hypocorism) of Jerzy. It may refer to:

 Jurek Becker (1937–1997), Polish-born German writer, screenwriter and East German dissident
 Jerzy Jurek Dybał (born 1977), Polish conductor and double-bassist
 Jurek Martin (born 1942), British-born journalist
 Jurek Wajdowicz (born 1951), Polish-born American artist, graphic designer, photographer and art director

Polish masculine given names
Hypocorisms